Arc de 124,5° is an outdoor sculpture by the French conceptual artist Bernar Venet, installed in Tempelhof-Schöneberg, Berlin, Germany.

References

External links

 

Buildings and structures in Tempelhof-Schöneberg
Outdoor sculptures in Berlin
Sculptures by Bernar Venet
Works by French people